Luis Óscar "Lucho" González (born 19 January 1981) is an Argentine former professional footballer, currently a manager. A versatile midfielder who was able to play in different positions but mainly in the centre, he was well known for his fierce shot, passing and work rate, being affectionately known as El Comandante (the commander) due to his leadership skills.

After starting with Huracán and River Plate, he signed for Porto in 2005, where he played 241 games and scored 61 goals across two spells, winning ten major titles. He also played in France with Marseille, Al-Rayyan in Qatar and Athletico Paranaense in Brazil; his 29 honours were surpassed only by Lionel Messi among his countrymen.

An Argentina international on 45 occasions, González represented his country in the 2006 World Cup and two Copa América tournaments.

Club career

Early years
González was born in Buenos Aires to a mother from Chile and a father from Uruguay. He began his career at Huracán at the age of 14, making his Primera División debut on 29 April 1999 in a 1–2 home loss against Racing Club. 

Three years later, González transferred to another side in his hometown, River Plate, where he won consecutive Clausura tournaments in 2003 and 2004, contributing 23 goals in 120 games across all competitions.

Porto
González's performances at River earned him a deal with Portugal's Porto in 2005, signing a five-year contract. In his first season he scored ten goals in 30 matches, including braces against Académica de Coimbra (5–1), Penafiel (3–1) and Vitória de Guimarães (3–1), helping the northerners to the first of their four consecutive Primeira Liga titles.

González eventually became team captain at Porto. In November 2006, he agreed to an improved five-year deal and, in August of the following year, the club paid €6.65 million to Global Soccer Agencies (later renamed Rio Football Services) to achieve full ownership of the player, activating the clause by rejecting an offer from Everton.

On 22 March 2009, González netted against Estrela da Amadora in the first leg of the semi-finals of the Taça de Portugal (2–0 home win, 3–2 on aggregate). During the league campaign, he scored nine times in only 23 appearances to help the team to the fourth title in a row; the season ended with the double conquest.

Marseille

In June 2009, González was sold to Marseille in France for a fee of €18 million, with the possibility of an increase to €24 million depending on the player's performance; the four-year transfer was the most expensive in the club's history. He scored his first official goal for his new side on 19 September, opening a 4–2 home victory over Montpellier, and also found the net on 26 November in the 1–1 draw with A.C. Milan in the group stage of the UEFA Champions League, at the San Siro. He scored against Real Madrid in an ensuing fixture on 8 December, but later missed a penalty kick in the 1–3 home loss, with the subsequent relegation to the UEFA Europa League. 

After the winter break, González also helped Marseille to reach the Coupe de la Ligue final, scoring against Lille in the quarter-finals (2–1) in late January. On 28 February, he scored in a 3–0 away defeat of Paris Saint-Germain which left L'OM in fourth place. He finished his first season with 32 matches and five goals, winning a league/league cup double.

González scored his first goal of the 2010–11 campaign on 29 August 2010, in a 1–1 draw at Bordeaux. On 3 November, he grabbed a brace in the 7–0 away rout of Žilina in the Champions League group phase.

González started in the 2011 Coupe de la Ligue Final, won 1–0 against Montpellier. He was linked with a transfer to England's Arsenal in early May 2011 because of his solid performances, to which he responded that "I don't know why there are so many things said about this at the moment. It annoys me a bit. At no time has it left my mouth that I wanted to leave or that I didn't feel good here. I have a contract with OM until 2013 and the people at the club seem happy with me." On 8 May, Marseille faced title challengers Lyon at the Stade de Gerland, and he scored in an eventual 3–2 defeat, with his team eventually finishing second to Lille. After the season ended, chairman Jean-Claude Dassier confirmed that he was seeking an exit from the club.

Despite the constant speculation, González remained at the Stade Vélodrome for 2011–12. On the first fixture, he opened the score in the 38th minute of a 2–2 home draw against Sochaux. On 13 September, he netted the game's only goal at Olympiacos in the Champions League group stage, where he also earned Player of the match accolades.

Return to Porto

On 30 January 2012, after 124 competitive appearances for Marseille, González returned to Porto, signing until June 2014. He scored in his first match in his second spell, a 2–0 win against Vitória de Setúbal in the Taça da Liga on 5 February. He opened a 2–0 home victory over Olhanense on 31 March, his first league goal since returning.

In 2012–13, Porto won a third consecutive league title after an unbeaten season with González as captain; he opened a decisive 2–0 win at Paços de Ferreira on the final day. In the Champions League, he netted in away and home group wins over Dinamo Zagreb with the former coming on the day of his father's death; the goals gave him the record figure of 16 in that phase of the competition, while he never scored any later on. He added two more the following season, as the Dragons came third at that stage and fell into the Europa League.

Later career
On 27 January 2014, González signed with Qatari club Al-Rayyan, initially until June. Eighteen months later, he returned to his country's league and River Plate for the first time in a decade, signing until 2017. He played as a substitute in their Copa Libertadores finals win over Tigres and the victory against Gamba Osaka in the 2015 Suruga Bank Championship in his first year back. 

At the age of 35 on 16 September 2016, González joined Brazil's Athletico Paranaense. He played 160 times and scored ten goals for the side, winning five trophies including the Copa Sudamericana in 2018.

González announced his retirement on 27 May 2021, at the age of 40. He returned to his final club in January as assistant to manager Alberto Valentim; in April he was named as the latter's interim replacement, but chose to leave within 24 hours. 

On 24 August 2022, González signed his first coaching contract for fellow Campeonato Brasileiro Série A team Ceará, until the end of the season. He drew 1–1 at Flamengo on his debut on 4 September, and was dismissed on 28 October after only one win in ten matches.

International career
Under the guidance of Marcelo Bielsa, González earned his first cap for the Argentina national team on 31 January 2003 against Honduras. He went on to represent the nation in the 2004 Copa América, scoring two goals during the tournament as the country lost the final on penalties to Brazil.

González also played with the side that won the gold medal at the 2004 Summer Olympics. In 2006, he was selected for the 2006 FIFA World Cup in which Argentina, managed by José Pekerman, lost to hosts Germany in the quarter-finals on penalties.

Subsequently, González was part of the Alfio Basile–led squad at 2007 Copa América, where the Albiceleste was again defeated by Brazil in the decisive match, now 3–0.

Career statistics

Club

International

|-
| 1 || 31 January 2003 || Olímpico Metropolitano, San Pedro Sula, Honduras || || 1–2 || 1–3 || Friendly || 
|-
| 2 || 8 February 2003 || Orange Bowl, Miami, United States ||  || 0–1 || 0–1 || Friendly || 
|-
| 3 || 7 July 2004 || Elías Aguirre, Chiclayo, Peru ||  || 6–1 || 6–1 || 2004 Copa América || 
|-
| 4 || 20 July 2004 || Estadio Nacional, Lima, Peru ||  || 2–0 || 3–0 || 2004 Copa América || 
|-
| 5 || 9 October 2004 || Estadio Monumental, Buenos Aires, Argentina ||  || 1–0 || 4–2 || 2006 World Cup qualification || 
|-
| 6 || 1 April 2009 || Hernando Siles, La Paz, Bolivia ||  || 1–6 || 1–6 || 2010 World Cup qualification || 
|}

Coaching statistics

Honours

Club

Huracán
Primera B Nacional: 2000

River Plate
Argentine Primera División: Clausura 2003, Clausura 2004
Copa Libertadores: 2015
J.League Cup / Copa Sudamericana Championship: 2015

Porto
Primeira Liga: 2005–06, 2006–07, 2007–08, 2008–09, 2011–12, 2012–13
Taça de Portugal: 2005–06, 2008–09
Supertaça Cândido de Oliveira: 2012, 2013

Marseille
Ligue 1: 2009–10
Coupe de la Ligue: 2009–10, 2010–11, 2011–12
Trophée des Champions: 2010, 2011

Al-Rayyan
Qatari Second Division: 2014–15

Athletico Paranaense
Copa do Brasil: 2019
Copa Sudamericana: 2018
J.League Cup / Copa Sudamericana Championship: 2019
Campeonato Paranaense: 2020

International
Argentina U23
Summer Olympic Games: 2004
CONMEBOL Pre-Olympic Tournament: 2004

Argentina
Copa América runner-up: 2004, 2007

Individual
Copa América Team of the Tournament: 2004
South American Team of the Year: 2004
Portuguese Golden Ball: 2009
SJPF Player of the Month: October 2007
FC Porto Player of the Year: 2006
UNFP Player of the Month: April 2010

References

External links

 

1981 births
Living people
Argentine people of Uruguayan descent
Argentine sportspeople of Chilean descent
Argentine footballers
Footballers from Buenos Aires
Association football midfielders
Argentine Primera División players
Primera Nacional players
Club Atlético Huracán footballers
Club Atlético River Plate footballers
Copa Libertadores-winning players
Primeira Liga players
FC Porto players
Ligue 1 players
Olympique de Marseille players
Qatar Stars League players
Qatari Second Division players
Al-Rayyan SC players
Campeonato Brasileiro Série A players
Club Athletico Paranaense players
Argentina international footballers
2006 FIFA World Cup players
2004 Copa América players
2007 Copa América players
Olympic footballers of Argentina
Footballers at the 2004 Summer Olympics
Olympic gold medalists for Argentina
Olympic medalists in football
Medalists at the 2004 Summer Olympics
Argentine expatriate footballers
Expatriate footballers in Portugal
Expatriate footballers in France
Expatriate footballers in Qatar
Expatriate footballers in Brazil
Argentine expatriate sportspeople in Portugal
Argentine expatriate sportspeople in France
Argentine expatriate sportspeople in Qatar
Argentine expatriate sportspeople in Brazil
Argentine football managers
Campeonato Brasileiro Série A managers
Ceará Sporting Club managers
Argentine expatriate football managers
Expatriate football managers in Brazil